Bliss is small lunar impact crater that is located just to the west of the dark-floored crater Plato. It lies in a region of continental terrain between Mare Imbrium to the south and Mare Frigoris to the north. This crater is bowl-shaped, with a small interior floor at the midpoint and a somewhat eroded outer rim.

In 2000, the IAU named this feature after Nathaniel Bliss, the 4th Astronomer Royal. He was the only remaining Astronomer Royal who had not until then received the honor of a named feature or astronomical body. (This revision was announced by the XXIVth general assembly of the IAU, on August 15, 2000.) This new name for the feature was originally suggested by Patrick Moore.

Note that a bulletin announcing the name of this crater described it as a ghost crater that lies between Plato and Mons Piton to the south. However this was due to a mix-up, and Bliss is actually the crater formerly known as Plato A. The ghost crater between Plato and Mons Piton is sometimes known unofficially as Ancient Newton (not to be confused with the crater Newton).

References

 
 
 
 
 
 
 
 
 
 
 
 

Impact craters on the Moon